Lucas Fernández (c. 1474 – 1542) was a Spanish dramatist and musician, writer in Leonese language.

He was born and educated at Salamanca, and was a professor of music there from 1522.

The surviving work of Lucas Fernández consists of six plays.  Although showing the influence of his rival Juan del Encina, they are notable for their dialogue, humor, and the effective interleaving of song and music with the action of play. The best of the works is an Easter play Auto de la Pasión, while his Dialogo para cantar is an early example of the zarzuela.

Leonesisms

Lucas Fernández wrote with a great influence of Leonese language, like  (feminine for "in the"),  (masculine for "in the"),  (let),  (says),  (wants),  (goes out), and many others.

Biography 
Son of Alfonso de Cantalapiedra and María Sánchez, he was at the service of the cathedral; he defeated his admired Juan del Encina in the oppositions to singer of the Cathedral of Salamanca (1498); to it alluded Encina in his Égloga of the great rains. In 1520 he was Abbot of the Church of Santo Tomás in Salamanca.  He was professor of music in the University of this city (1522) and appeared in 1533 in the commission of reform of the statutes of the same.

See also

 Leonese language
 Leonese language writers

References

Further reading 
 

1470s births
1542 deaths
People from Salamanca
Leonese-language writers
Spanish dramatists and playwrights
Spanish male dramatists and playwrights
Academic staff of the University of Salamanca